Here for a Good Time is the twenty-seventh studio album by American country music artist George Strait. It was released on September 6, 2011 via MCA Nashville. Strait co-produced the album with his long-time producer Tony Brown. The title track and lead-off single, "Here for a Good Time", co-written with son Bubba and songwriter Dean Dillon, was released in June 2011. The album sold 91,414 copies in its first week.
On November 30, 2011, the album received a nomination at the 54th Grammy Awards for Best Country Album.

Content
Strait co-wrote seven of the album’s eleven tracks with his son, Bubba Strait, and songwriter Dean Dillon. "Here for a Good Time," the lead off single, debuted at number 29 on the Billboard Hot Country Songs charts, making the second-highest debut of his career.

Here for a Good Time was recorded at Shrimpboat Sound Studio in Key West, Florida, the same studio where Strait recorded his last three albums.

"Lone Star Blues" was originally recorded by Delbert McClinton on his 2002 album, Room to Breathe.  "A Showman's Life" was originally recorded by the songwriter, Jesse Winchester, on his 1978 album, A Touch on the Rainy Side and by Gary Allan on his 2003 album, See If I Care.

Track listing

Personnel
 Eddie Bayers - drums
 Stuart Duncan - fiddle, mandolin
 Thom Flora - background vocals
 Paul Franklin - steel guitar
 Steve Gibson - acoustic guitar, electric guitar
 Wes Hightower - background vocals
 Faith Hill - background vocals on "A Showman's Life"
 Brent Mason - acoustic guitar, electric guitar
 Steve Nathan - Hammond B-3 organ, piano, synthesizer
 Matt Rollings - Hammond B-3 organ, piano, Wurlitzer
 Marty Slayton - background vocals
 Chris Stapleton - background vocals
 George Strait - lead vocals, background vocals
 Ilya Toshinsky - acoustic guitar, electric guitar
 Glenn Worf - bass guitar, upright bass

Chart positions
Here for a Good Time debuted at No.3 on the Billboard 200 chart and No.1 on the Country Albums chart with 91,000 copies. As of December 21, 2011, the album had sold 298k copies.

Weekly charts

Year-end charts

Singles

References

External links
 

2011 albums
George Strait albums
MCA Records albums
Albums produced by Tony Brown (record producer)